Edmílson Gonçalves Pimenta (born 17 September 1971 in Santa Teresa, Espírito Santo), known simply as Edmílson, is a Brazilian retired footballer who played in various attacking positions.

Football career
After starting out as a senior for modest Associação Atlética Colatina and Esporte Clube Democrata, Edmílson moved to Portugal in the 1993 off-season, going on to remain in the country for most of his professional career. He began with C.D. Nacional – in the second division – and S.C. Salgueiros, where his solid performances earned him a transfer to FC Porto in the Primeira Liga.

At Porto, Edmílson was instrumental as the club won the second and third of its five consecutive league accolades, signing a lucrative contract with French side Paris Saint-Germain FC. Unsettled, he returned to Portugal in January 1998, joining Sporting Clube de Portugal; he scored ten goals in his first full season with the Lions and, although not an essential first-team member, still contributed with 21 matches in 1999–2000 as they ended an 18-year drought and conquered the title.

Until his retirement in 2007, Edmílson played in quick succession with Sociedade Esportiva Palmeiras, Portimonense SC, FK Lyn, R.C.S. Visétois and amateurs CTE Colatina (two spells).

References

External links

1971 births
Living people
Sportspeople from Espírito Santo
Brazilian footballers
Association football wingers
Association football forwards
Campeonato Brasileiro Série A players
Campeonato Brasileiro Série B players
Esporte Clube Democrata players
Sociedade Esportiva Palmeiras players
Primeira Liga players
Liga Portugal 2 players
C.D. Nacional players
S.C. Salgueiros players
FC Porto players
Sporting CP footballers
Portimonense S.C. players
Ligue 1 players
Paris Saint-Germain F.C. players
Eliteserien players
Lyn Fotball players
Brazilian expatriate footballers
Expatriate footballers in Portugal
Brazilian expatriate sportspeople in Portugal
Expatriate footballers in France
Brazilian expatriate sportspeople in France
Expatriate footballers in Norway
Brazilian expatriate sportspeople in Norway
Expatriate footballers in Belgium
Brazilian expatriate sportspeople in Belgium